Vizhinjam is a region located in the city of Thiruvananthapuram, the capital of the state of Kerala in India. It is located 16 km south west from the city centre and 17 km south of Trivandrum International Airport along NH66. Adani Ports (APSEZ), India’s biggest private port operator, is currently developing a transhipment port in this area.

History
The history of Vizhinjam dates back to The Ay dynasty. Before the Cheras established themselves as a major force in Kerala, it was ruled by the Ay dynasty sometime between 7th to 11th century AD with Vizhinjam as the capital. The Ay kingdom extended between Nagercoil and Thiruvalla. During the second Sangam period (circa 850–1400 AD),the region was the scene of many battles between the Kulashekhara and the Cholas and Vizhinjam, the capital, was sacked by the Cholas.
When the kings of the Ay dynasty shifted their capital to Vizhinjam, they built a fort which is now considered to be the oldest fort in Kerala dating to the eighth or ninth century. A preliminary investigation by a team under Dr. Ajit has revealed the fort might have originally been 800 m² in area. The fort's wall can be found on the northern and western (seaside) parts and has been constructed using large boulders set in mud mortar. The wide base of the wall tapers on its way up. Even now this part of Vizhinjam is known as Kottapuram, 'Kotta' in Malayalam language and Malayalam means Fort. According to Dr. Ajit, one important clue in dating the fort is that the walls have no battlements or `loop holes' (holes to place cannons in). This is typical of early forts, he says.
The team was also able to trace literary and epigraphical references - of 9 AD to 12 AD vintage - to a fort and port at Vizhinjam. Sangam literature such as Pandikkovai, Iraiyanar Akapporul Kalingattuparani of Jayamkondar, and Vikrama Chola are said to have numerous references to the existence of a fort, port and a mansion at Vizhinjam.

Moreover, the Srivaramangalam copper plate's  of Pandyan King Nedum Chadayan ( 8 AD) have clear reference to Vizhinjam and its fort. "Here, the fort is described as surrounded by waters of three seas, protected by a wide moat, high walls which the sun's rays do not touch and so on. Leaving aside the hyperbole typical of such inscriptions, the ground evidence at Vizhinjam that fits this description of the old fort. In fact the port at Vizhinjam has been mentioned in the work `The Periplus of the Erythraean Sea', a work of the first century AD. Here Vizhinjam has been called as Balita," said Dr. Ajit.

The Portuguese and the Dutch had commercial establishments here. The Portuguese have built a church in Vizhinjam near to the sea shore, which is still functional and is referred as the Old Vizhinjam Church (Old St. Mary's Church). It is located in the vizhinjam fishing harbour area.

As per historians, Vizhinjam, located at the extreme south-western tip of South Asia, served as an important port throughout the history of the region. The location is economically and geopolitically significant as a key point connecting the shipping between Southeast Asia and the Middle East.

An international port at Vizhinjam was conceived as early as 1991. In August 2015, the Kerala government and Adani Vizhinjam Port (AVPL), representing the Adani Group, signed the agreement for the Adani Vizhinjam project. AVPL was the only bidder for the project.

As per the details of the agreement, Adani Group is free to operate the Vizhinjam port for 40 years (extendable by 20 more years). The Kerala state government will start getting a portion of the revenue from the port after 15 years. The project also includes 360 acres of land (of which around 36% are reclaimed from the sea) and a railway line (around 10 km long). The deadline for the commission of Phase I, Adani Vizhinjam Port was fixed on 4 December 2019 in the 2015 agreement.

The entire Vizhinjam project was valued at around Rs. 75.25 billion. The AVPL had requested a Rs 16.35 billion grant for the project from the Kerala state government.

The project commenced on 5 December 2015. AVPL had announced that the "first ship will berth at Vizhinjam" on 1 September 2018 (the 1,000 days target). The AVPL is currently seeking an extension of the Phase I commission deadline to October 2020 from the Kerala government.

As per a Reuters report, China had also wanted to partner with an un-named Indian company to build the port, but its overture was rejected by New Delhi on grounds of national security. It is speculated that the port will have berths for India's navy and coastguard.

Public Protests
There were large scale public protests against the controversial Adani controlled port and the abuse of their human rights in November 2022.  Christian Priests led the protestors, who primarily belong to the dispossessed fishermen community.

Transport

Regular buses operate in Vizhinjam from the City Bus Stand at East Fort, Trivandrum and as well as from the Central Bus Stand at Thampanoor, Trivandrum. Cabs can be also hired at the bus stations.

See also
 Vizhinjam International Seaport
 Vizhinjam Rock Caves

References

External links
 https://www.vizhinjamport.in/home.html

Tourist attractions in Thiruvananthapuram
History of Kerala
Villages in Thiruvananthapuram district
Populated coastal places in India
Suburbs of Thiruvananthapuram